Renovator may refer to:

 renovator is a person that carries out a renovation.
 The Renovators (TV series) a renovation based Australian TV game show

Political parties
The Renovators' may refer to:
 Renovator Movement, a Salvadoran political party
 Renovator Labour Party (PTR), a Brazilian political party
 National Renovator Party, a political party of Portugal
 Civic Renovator Party (PCR), a political party of the Dominican Republic
 Democratic Renovator Party (disambiguation)

See also

 Renovate Now, a political block of France in the Socialist Party
 Renovation (disambiguation)